George Scripcaru  (born September 3, 1966, Doljești, Neamț County) is a Romanian politician and was the mayor of Brașov between 2004 and 2020.  In 2011, he was elected as one of the 15 vice-presidents of the Democratic Liberal Party.

He is a graduate of the Faculty of Physical Education and Sport of the West University, Timișoara.

He is married and has one daughter.

Political activity
 1992–1994: member of Democratic Party (PD), president of the Youth Organisation
 1994–2000: president of Brașov County Youth Organisation; vice-president of the National Youth Organisation
 1996–2000: councillor in Brașov Local Council
 1998–1999: president of APR Brașov
 2001–2014: president of Brașov County Democratic Liberal Party (PDL) Organisation
 2004-2020: Mayor of Brașov

Notes

External links
Personal website
Brașov County PD-L Organisation

1966 births
Living people
People from Neamț County
West University of Timișoara alumni
Mayors of places in Romania
Councillors in Romania
Democratic Liberal Party (Romania) politicians